Rob Green is a film director, producer, editor and screenwriter.

Biography
He is most notable for The Bunker and the drama-horror-thriller House. He works currently on his upcoming project, the history science fiction film Gladiators v Werewolves: Edge of Empire.

Filmography
 The Black Cat (1995)
 The Trick (1997)
 The Bunker (2001)
 House (2008)

References

External links
 

Living people
Year of birth missing (living people)
American film directors
American male screenwriters
American film editors
American film producers